David A. Spencer is the Mars Sample Return Campaign Mission Manager at the Jet Propulsion Laboratory. As an aerospace engineer, Spencer designs and operates planetary spacecraft.

Education 
Spencer received B.S. and M.S. degrees in aeronautics and astronautics from Purdue University in W. Lafayette, Indiana. He earned his Ph.D. from the Guggenheim School of Aerospace Engineering at the Georgia Institute of Technology, completing a dissertation on automated proximity operations using relative orbital elements.

Spaceflight career 
Spencer worked at NASA's Jet Propulsion Laboratory from 1991 through 2008. He served on the mission design and navigation team for the TOPEX/Poseidon mission, and he was the lead mission designer for Mars Pathfinder, responsible for the design of the interplanetary transfer and the entry, descent and landing (EDL) trajectory.  Spencer served as the mission manager for NASA's Mars Odyssey from 1997-2002, and Deep Impact from 2004-2005, leading the mission design and operations for the projects. He was the deputy project manager for the Phoenix Mars Lander, with a focus on EDL and surface operations.  Spencer left JPL in 2008 to join the Aerospace Engineering faculty at Georgia Tech.

At Georgia Tech, Spencer founded the Center for Space Systems, and was the Co-Director of the Space Systems Design Laboratory, a multi-disciplinary research and educational organization dedicated to the design, development and operations of advanced space systems and technologies.  He initiated a small satellite program at Georgia Tech, establishing facilities for satellite fabrication, testing, tracking and operations. Spencer transitioned from Georgia Tech in 2016 to join the faculty of the School of Aeronautics and Astronautics at Purdue University, where he conducted research on small satellite applications, proximity operations, and aeroassist technologies.  He led the Purdue Engineering Initiative on cislunar space, with the goal of expanding the orbital economy to encompass the cislunar environment.

Spencer served as mission manager for The Planetary Society's LightSail 1 spacecraft, leading the mission design and system engineering of the solar sail demonstration project. LightSail 1 was launched on May 20, 2015. Spencer led the team through a successful solar sail deployment almost a month later, before LightSail 1 reentered Earth's atmosphere. Spencer is the project manager for a second LightSail spacecraft, LightSail 2, launched in 2019. LightSail 2 was deployed into orbit by the Prox-1 spacecraft developed by Spencer and students at Georgia Tech.  LightSail 2 successfully demonstrated controlled solar sailing in Earth orbit. He is the Founder and CEO of the 2019 startup Vestigo Aerospace, a space technology company that markets dragsails for the deorbit of space vehicles. Vestigo Aerospace incorporated in 2022 and received $375,000 in seed funding from strategic investment firm Manhattan West.

Spencer returned to JPL in 2020 to become the Mission System Manager for the Mars Sample Return Campaign, with the objective to return a geologically diverse set of Mars samples for Earth-based laboratory analysis. The Mars Sample Return Campaign is a joint effort between the National Aeronautics and Space Administration (NASA) and the European Space Agency (ESA).

Honors and distinctions
 JPL Award for Excellence, Mars Pathfinder Entry, Descent and Landing design, 1998.
 NASA Exceptional Achievement Medal, Mars Pathfinder mission design, 1998.
 JPL Award for Excellence, Mars Surveyor 2001 trajectory design, 1999.
 NASA Exceptional Service Medal, Mars Odyssey mission system leadership, 2003.
 Outstanding Aerospace Engineer Award, Purdue University, 2004.
 NASA Exceptional Achievement Medal, Deep Impact mission management, 2006.
 NASA Space Act Award, Entry, Descent and Landing Monte Carlo Simulation, 2007.
 NASA Exceptional Achievement Medal, Phoenix project management, 2009.
 NASA Group Achievement Award (6 times)
 Associate Fellow, American Institute of Aeronautics and Astronautics, 2010.
 Outstanding Aerospace Teachers, College of Engineering, Purdue University, 2019.
 Most Impactful Faculty Inventors, Purdue College of Engineering, 2019.

Selected publications

References 

American aerospace engineers
Living people
Purdue University faculty
Purdue University School of Aeronautics and Astronautics alumni
Georgia Tech alumni
1965 births